Cape Town is the legislative capital of South Africa.

Cape Town or Capetown may also refer to:

 City of Cape Town, the metropolitan municipality that includes Cape Town and surrounding areas
 Cape Town (TV series), South African-German produced TV series
 HMS Capetown (D88), a light cruiser of the Royal Navy
 Capetown, California, United States

See also
 Cape Town Treaty, or The Cape Town Convention on International Interests in Mobile Equipment
 Cape Town railway station, the terminal in Cape Town